Avoca Hockey Club (Irish: Cumann Haca Abhóca) is a field hockey club based at Newpark Comprehensive School in Blackrock, Dublin. The club was originally founded in 1895 and a women's team was added in 1973. Avoca enters various men's and women's teams in junior, senior and veterans leagues and cup competitions affiliated to the Leinster Hockey Association. Avoca men have won both the Men's Irish Senior Cup and the Men's Irish Junior Cup. Avoca Women won the Irish Hockey Trophy in 2022. The club has also represented Ireland in European competitions, finishing third in the 1993 EuroHockey Club Trophy.

History

Avoca Hockey Club was originally formed in 1895 by past and current students at Avoca School. In 1897 the club won its first national trophy when the second team won the  Irish Junior Cup. The modern club was re-formed in 1929. When Avoca School amalgamated with Kingstown Grammar School in 1973 to become Newpark Comprehensive School, the field hockey club retained the Avoca name. In 1996 Avoca celebrated its centenary season by winning the Irish Senior Cup for the first time.

Men's Irish Senior Cup

Notes

Men's Irish Junior Cup

Home grounds
The club has played at the Avoca School/Newpark Comprehensive School site since 1936. The club also shares an astroturf pitch with Dominican College Sion Hill and rents a  pitch at Loreto College, Foxrock.

Notable players

Men's internationals

When Ireland won the silver medal at the 1908 Summer Olympics, the squad included two former Avoca players, Jack Peterson and his brother Walter Peterson. Jack and Walter's four brothers – Cecil, Herbert, Nicholas and William – also played for Avoca and Ireland.

 R. F. Leitch (field hockey)
 D. Coulson (field hockey) Irish Captain
 Jonathan Cole (field hockey) Irish Captain
 David Richardson (field hockey
 Simon Filgas (field hockey)
 Mark Cullen (field hockey)
 Johnny Watterson (field hockey)
 Peter Agnew (field hockey)
 Nigel Kingston (field hockey)
 Anton Scott (field hockey)
 Orla Bell (field hockey)
 Fion Breheny (field hockey)
 Carolyn Shankey (field hockey)
 Galahad Goulet (field hockey)
 Brian Long (field hockey)
 Liam Canning (indoor hockey)
 Colin Hade (field hockey)
 Peter Darley (field hockey)
 Robert Ryan (field hockey)
 Philip Shier (Indoor hockey)

Notable coaches
 David Judge

Honours

Men
Irish Senior Cup
Winners: 1995–96: 1 
Runners Up: 1983, 1985, 1989, 1993: 4
Irish Junior Cup
Winners: 1896–97, 1964–65, 1996–97: 3 
British and Irish Club Championship
Winners: 1984: 1
Irish Club Champions
Winners 1991-92, 1992-93:
 Irish Indoor Club Champions
Winners 1990:

References

External links
 Avoca Hockey Club on Facebook
  Avoca Hockey Club on Twitter

Field hockey clubs in Dún Laoghaire–Rathdown
1895 establishments in Ireland
Field hockey clubs established in 1895